Orland Emile White (1885–1972) was a botanist who travelled to the Amazon basin on the Mulford Expedition. He directed the arboretum now known as the Orland E. White Research Arboretum in Virginia.

A collection of his papers (3300 items) is at the University of Virginia Library

References

1885 births
1972 deaths
American botanists
Amazon basin
University of Virginia faculty
South Dakota State University alumni
Harvard University alumni